Let It Snow, Baby... Let It Reindeer is the second Christmas album by Christian rock band Relient K.

Release
On August 22, 2007, Let It Snow, Baby... Let It Reindeer was announced for released in two months' time. It was released on October 23, 2007, selling 4,500 copies in its first week. The album is a re-release of the band's Christmas EP, Deck the Halls, Bruise Your Hand, but with seven new songs and some other changes, such as track listing and a new ending to one song. The details were announced by Jesus Freak Hideout on August 21, 2007, and by IGN around the same time. The album peaked at No. 96 on the Billboard 200 list in its fourth week.

"Silver Bells" was posted on the group's Myspace account on November 7, 2008. A re-issue of the album was released on iTunes on November 18, 2008. It included Relient K's renditions of "Silver Bells", "God Rest Ye Merry Gentlemen", and "O Holy Night", as well as a music video for the band's version of "Sleigh Ride". The songs were eventually pulled from iTunes, but have since then been added to Gotee's 2010 Christmas compilation CD: 'Tis The Season To Be Gotee.<ref>{{cite web|url=http://www.jesusfreakhideout.com/cdreviews/TisTheSeasonToBeGotee.asp |title=Tis The Season To Be Gotee review on Jesus Freak Hideout |publisher=Jesus Freak Hideout |date=December 26, 2010 |accessdate=December 30, 2014}}</ref>

Music video
The band's video for "Sleigh Ride" was made by Funny Pages Productions. It is an animated video, and the band had mentioned in recent years that they always wanted to do an animated video. It features all of the band members as rabbits in winter. The Matt Thiessen rabbit fails to get the attention of a girl rabbit, which leads the other four band members to steal Santa's sleigh so that he can impress her. After the two take off in the sleigh, Santa tries to get it back by using a giant snowman. After some close calls, the other band members build a snowwoman to draw the snowman off. In the end, they give Santa his sleigh back, and the Ethan Luck rabbit sneaks a present from Santa's sleigh for Matt to give to the girl rabbit. The video was released in November 2008.

Track listing
All tracks not written by Matt Thiessen are public domain. New verses on tracks 6 and 11 written by Matt Thiessen.

Tracks 4, 5, 6, 7, 8, 11, 12, 13, 14 and 16 appeared originally on the 2003 release Deck the Halls, Bruise Your Hand.  Track 9 originally on the Apathetic EP''.

PersonnelRelient K Matt Thiessen – lead vocals, rhythm guitar, piano
 Matt Hoopes – lead guitar, backing vocals
 Brian Pittman – bass (2003 tracks only)
 Dave Douglas – drums, backing vocals (all tracks except 2008 re-release tracks)
 John Warne - bass, backing vocals (2007 and 2008 tracks only)
 Jon Schneck - rhythm guitar, backing vocals (2007 and 2008 tracks only)Additional production'''
 Ethan Luck - drums (2008 re-release tracks only)
 Mark Lee Townsend - producer
 Davy Baysinger (formerly of Bleach) - artwork

References

Relient K albums
Gotee Records albums
Albums produced by Mark Lee Townsend
2007 Christmas albums
Christmas albums by American artists
Pop Christmas albums
Rock Christmas albums